Sani Abacha International Airport  is an airport serving Gombe, the capital of Gombe State of Nigeria.  It was built along the Bauchi to Gombe road by the village of Lawanti in Akko Local Government Area,Gombe .  Planning began in 2005 and was certified for flights in 2008, first International flight to Jeddah, Saudi Arabia.
Gombe  International airport can accommodate cargo planes,  Gombe International Airport Lawanti is 3.5 kilometers length and can accommodate as many cargo planes at a time. The airport is fully equipped with modern facilities and is secured and safe for domestic and foreign trips. 
.

Airlines and destinations

Federal Government's Takeover of the Airport 
President Muhammadu Buhari has granted the approval of the takeover of the Gombe Lawanti International Airport by the Federal Government of Nigeria. The information was disclosed after the meeting the Gombe State governor, Muhammad Inuwa Yahaya had with President Buhari in his office at the Presidential Villa, Abuja.

References

External links
 

Airports in Nigeria
Gombe State